Berkan Emir (born 6 February 1988) is a Turkish footballer who plays as a defender for Eyüpspor.

References

External links

1988 births
Sportspeople from İzmit
Living people
Turkish footballers
Association football defenders
Alanyaspor footballers
Karacabey Belediyespor footballers
Gümüşhanespor footballers
Kahramanmaraşspor footballers
Karşıyaka S.K. footballers
Balıkesirspor footballers
Kayserispor footballers
Göztepe S.K. footballers
Eyüpspor footballers
Süper Lig players
TFF First League players
TFF Second League players
TFF Third League players
21st-century Turkish people